Marco Antonio da Silva (born May 9, 1966), also knows as Marquinhos is a former Brazilian football player.

Club statistics

National team statistics

References

External links

1966 births
Living people
Brazilian footballers
Brazil international footballers
Brazilian expatriate footballers
J1 League players
Japan Football League (1992–1998) players
Expatriate footballers in Japan
Clube Atlético Mineiro players
Sport Club Internacional players
América Futebol Clube (MG) players
Cerezo Osaka players
Association football midfielders
Footballers from Belo Horizonte